The Lake Butler Woman's Club, also known as the Old Union County Courthouse, is an historic building now located at 285 NE First Avenue in Lake Butler, Union County, Florida. It was built in 1923 on the site of the present Union County Courthouse. This replaced two previous courthouses which had served Bradford County, from which Union County had been separated in 1921. When the new courthouse was built in 1936, this building was moved to its present site and given to the Woman's Club.

In 1989, the Lake Butler Woman's Club was listed in A Guide to Florida's Historic Architecture, published by the University of Florida Press.

On December 23, 2003, it was added to the National Register of Historic Places.

References

Clubhouses on the National Register of Historic Places in Florida
Buildings and structures in Union County, Florida
Union County
Women's club buildings in Florida
Women's clubs in Florida
National Register of Historic Places in Union County, Florida